Heterochlamydomonas is a genus of green algae in the order Chlamydomonadales.

References

External links

Chlamydomonadales genera
Chlamydomonadaceae